Cornelius Hoagland Tangeman (August 21, 1878 - December 18, 1928) was an American automobile manufacturer with the Hol-Tan.

Biography
He was born in Hamilton, Ohio, on August 21, 1878 to George Tangeman and Cora Hoagland. He died on December 18, 1928, after a long illness. His widow died in 1929.

References

1878 births
1928 deaths
People from Hamilton, Ohio
American founders of automobile manufacturers